Pablo Martín Rodríguez (born 7 March 1977 in Ramos Mejia) is a retired Argentine professional football player.

Career
Rodríguez began his playing career with Argentinos Juniors in the Argentine 2nd division, in 1997 they won the championship and promotion to the Primera División. later that year he was part of the Argentina U-20 squad that won the 1997 FIFA World Youth Championship.

After failing a medical at English side Crystal Palace he joined French side OGC Nice where he played between 1998 and 2003. he also played for CD Leganés in Spain and S.C. Beira-Mar in Portugal.

In 2005, he returned to South America to join Uruguayan side Montevideo Wanderers F.C. After only a few months in Uruguay he returned to Argentina where he played for Olimpo de Bahía Blanca and 3rd division side El Porvenir. His last club was Colón de Santa Fe in 2009.

Actually he is the manager of the 3rd division squad in Club Nacional de Futbol, one of the two biggest teams in Uruguay.

Honours
Argentinos Juniors
Primera B Nacional (1): 1996–97
Argentina U-20
FIFA World Youth Championship (1): 1997

External links
 

1977 births
Living people
Argentine footballers
Association football midfielders
Argentinos Juniors footballers
OGC Nice players
CD Leganés players
S.C. Beira-Mar players
Montevideo Wanderers F.C. players
Olimpo footballers
Club Atlético Colón footballers
Argentine Primera División players
Ligue 1 players
Segunda División players
Primeira Liga players
Uruguayan Primera División players
Primera Nacional players
Argentina youth international footballers
Argentina under-20 international footballers
Argentine expatriate footballers
Argentine expatriate sportspeople in France
Argentine expatriate sportspeople in Spain
Argentine expatriate sportspeople in Portugal
Argentine expatriate sportspeople in Uruguay
Expatriate footballers in France
Expatriate footballers in Spain
Expatriate footballers in Portugal
Expatriate footballers in Uruguay
Argentine football managers
C.A. Cerro managers
Danubio F.C. managers